The Shirley Institute was established in 1920 as the British Cotton Industry Research Association at The Towers in Didsbury, Manchester, as a research centre dedicated to cotton production technologies. It was funded by the Cotton Board through a statutory levy. A significant contribution to the purchase price of The Towers was made by William Greenwood, the MP for Stockport, who asked that the building be named after his daughter. The Institute developed Ventile, a special high-quality woven cotton fabric. It also developed the tog as an easy-to-follow measure of the thermal resistance of textiles, as an alternative to the SI unit of m2K/W.

The BCRA merged with the British Rayon Research Association to form the Cotton, Silk, and Man-Made Fibres Research Association in 1961.

Douglas Hill was director of research of the BCRA before the merger, and led the new organisation. The director of the BRRA, Leonard Albert Wiseman became deputy director. Len Wiseman became director on Hill's retirement in 1969, and held the post until 1980.

In 1987–1990 it merged with the Wira Technology Group to form the British Textile Technology Group (BTTG).

See also
 Robert Howson Pickard FRS, director 1937-1943 who expanded the technical facilities extensively in 1936.
 Mary Corner worked initially in the rayon department where she developed a fascination with microanalysis which resulted in a promotion to Head of the Microanalytical Section.

References

External links

 The British Textile Technology Group

British research associations
Cotton industry in England
Cotton organizations
Didsbury
Research institutes in Manchester